St. Stepanos Monastery was an Armenian monastery located near the village of Shurud (Julfa District) of the Nakhchivan Autonomous Republic of Azerbaijan.

History 
The monastery was founded in the 9th or 10th centuries. It was renovated in the 17th century as well as in the 19th–20th centuries.

Architecture 
The monastery had a single-chamber nave, a rectangular apse, and an entryway in the west. There were Armenian inscriptions inside the monastery.

Destruction 
The monastery was destroyed at some point between 1997 and June 15, 2006, as documented by investigation of the Caucasus Heritage Watch.

References 

Ruins in Azerbaijan
Armenian churches in Azerbaijan